Shadow III may refer to:

Shadow III, a knife manufactured by Chris Reeve Knives
USS Shadow III (SP-102), a United States Navy patrol boat in commission from 1917 to 1919